Tales from the Hood is a 1995 American comedy horror anthology film directed by Rusty Cundieff and executive-produced by Spike Lee. The film presents four short urban-themed horror stories based on problem concepts that affect the African-American community in the order of police corruption, domestic abuse, racism, and gang violence, all presented within a frame story of three drug dealers buying some "found" drugs from an eccentric and story-prone funeral director.

Plot

"Welcome to My Mortuary" (prologue)
In South Central Los Angeles, a trio of drug dealers—Stack, Ball and Bulldog—arrive at Simms' Funeral Home to purchase some drugs from Mr. Simms, the mortuary's eccentric owner.

Mr. Simms claims that he found the drugs in an alley, and has safely stored them in his mortuary. He asks the dealers to help him get the drugs, and as the four make their way through the building, relates stories about some of the dead bodies in the funeral home. The first casket contains the body of Clarence Smith, a man who was rumored to have heard voices of the dead calling his name.

"Rogue Cop Revelation"
During his first night on the job, young black police officer Clarence Smith is taken by his new white partner, Newton Hauser, to the scene of what initially appears to be a routine traffic stop of a well-dressed black man by two white cops. When Smith runs the car's license plates, he learns that the man is in fact Martin Ezekiel Moorehouse, a city councilman and black rights activist who has recently been on a crusade to eliminate police corruption in the city. Smith watches in horror as Newton, along with fellow white officers, Billy Crumfield and Strom Richmond, brutally beat Moorehouse with their nightsticks and vandalize his car. When Smith insists that Moorehouse should be taken to a hospital, the officers appear to agree. Smith tells Newton that Billy and Strom should be reported for what they did, but Newton tells Smith that officers are not to break "the code" and rat each other out. Smith and Newton leave in their car. Strom and Billy don't take Moorehouse to the hospital. Instead, they drive Moorehouse's car to the docks. Strom shoots the battered Moorehouse up with some of the heroin that he, Newton, and Billy have been dealing, plants some in his car, then pushes it into the water with Moorehouse still inside. Moorehouse is posthumously and falsely labeled a hypocrite.

One year later, Smith has left the police force and is now a guilt-consumed drunk. On a walk in his neighborhood, he sees a mural of Moorehouse. Smith then has a vision of a crucified Moorehouse haunting him with the words "Bring them to me!" In response, Smith convinces the three criminal police officers to meet him at Moorehouse's grave on the anniversary of the murder. Once there, Smith denounces the officers for killing Moorehouse and destroying his reputation.  The officers begin to insult Moorehouse, with Strom urinating on Moorehouse's grave and then ordering Billy to do the same thing. As Newton and Strom prepare to kill Smith, a zombified Moorehouse bursts from the grave to drag Billy beneath the ground by his genitals. Moorehouse's coffin bursts from the ground, opening to reveal Billy's mutilated corpse, with Moorehouse standing above the grave, clutching Billy's still-beating heart.

Strom and Newton open fire on Moorehouse, but the bullets have no effect, prompting them to flee in horror. A lengthy chase ensues, with the two cops fleeing by patrol car. As Newton is driving the vehicle, Moorehouse jumps on top of the vehicle and decapitates Strom with his bare hands. Terrified, Newton exits his vehicle and shoots its gas tank, though the ensuing explosion doesn't rid him of Moorehouse. Moorehouse then chases Newton into an alley, where he telekinetically throws used hypodermic needles into the cop's body, pinning him to Moorehouse's wall mural. After Newton is killed, his body melts into the mural, becoming a painting of himself crucified.

His vengeance nearly complete, Moorehouse accosts Smith, asking him why he did not help him when he was being beaten. The story ends with Smith in a mental hospital. Two orderlies outside his cell mention that he killed the officers and that he used to be an officer himself. Moorehouse is never mentioned.

Stack, Ball, and Bulldog think Mr. Simms is crazy after hearing the story. After looking into another casket, the contents of which are not seen, Mr. Simms tells them a story about a boy named Walter.

"Boys Do Get Bruised"
Walter Johnson is a quiet and sensitive boy who transfers to a new school one day with bruises around his cheek and eye. Walter's caring teacher, Richard Garvey, notices the bruises and talks to Walter. He initially thinks that the school bully, Tyrone, gave him the bruises. Although Tyrone has bullied Walter, Walter claims that the bruises came after he was attacked by a monster. A few days later, he shows up with a bruised arm. While the other children play, Walter sits inside and draws pictures of Tyrone and the monster. Walter explains to Garvey that he can overcome something he doesn't like, such as the monster he keeps talking about, by destroying an image of it. After Garvey leaves, Walter crumples up the drawing of Tyrone, causing the real Tyrone to suffer spontaneous injuries.

Later that night, Garvey visits Walter's home and asks Walter's mother, Sissy, about the monster. Sissy claims that Walter's injuries are the result of his own clumsiness; she then tells Walter not to reveal anything about the monster to anyone else. Sissy's domineering boyfriend, Carl, comes home. Mr. Garvey eventually leaves. Seen through Walter's imagination, it is revealed that Carl is, in actuality, the "monster". Thinking that Walter is mocking him by drawing him as a monster, Carl begins to attack Walter and then hits and whips Sissy with a belt when she intervenes.

Garvey turns around to check on Walter and sees Carl beating Sissy through the window. Garvey runs into the house and begins to fight Carl. In a long fight sequence, Carl knocks out Garvey and almost kills a valiant Sissy. With Carl's attention elsewhere, Walter grabs a drawing he made of the monster, and begins to fold and crumple it. Carl's body crumples and collapses in a similar fashion. Sissy stomps on the wadded-up paper to kill Carl. Finally, Garvey gives the paper to Walter, who burns it. Sissy and Walter look on, relieved, as Carl's body is burned.

Back in Simms' Funeral Home, Carl's burnt and mangled corpse is revealed to be inside the coffin. The gangsters close the casket, causing a doll to fall off a nearby shelf. For his next story, Mr. Simms shows them the doll, mentioning that he originally found it in a home in the South. Simms explains that it is not an ordinary doll, but a vessel for a lost soul.

"KKK Comeuppance"
Duke Metger is an obnoxious and highly racist Southern senator and a one-time member of the Ku Klux Klan who is currently running for governor. The senator is in his office filming a campaign commercial when he sees protesters outside the office. Jewish and African-American groups have teamed up to protest against Metger for being a racist, a former Klansman, and for setting up his office at an old slave plantation previously owned by his ancestor, Nathan Wilkes. One individual, Eli, tells the reporter that the plantation is haunted by dolls animated by the souls of Wilkes's previously tortured slaves, warning the news crews and everyone else at the scene that it is not a myth.

Meanwhile, Metger also discusses the myth of the tortured slaves with his African-American "image-maker" assistant Rhodie Willis. Metger explains how Wilkes, upon hearing that his slaves would be freed at the end of the Civil War, flew into a murderous rage and massacred all of them. The two notice a large painting of Miss Cobbs, the hoodoo witch who transferred the slaves' souls inside a number of small dolls that she created, surrounded by the dolls themselves, which Metger refers to as "Negro dolls". According to legend, the dolls are supposedly still in the house. One of the dolls is seen under the floorboard as Rhodie leaves. While Metger and Rhodie are working on Metger's media skills, Rhodie suddenly stumbles and falls down the stairs to his death. At the funeral, Eli warns Metger to leave the house before he ends up like Rhodie. In the limo after Rhodie's funeral, Metger notices the doll and orders his African-American driver to pull over so he can throw the doll out the window and into the street.

Later, Metger re-watches Rhodie's footage and realizes that he died because he tripped over the doll. After noticing a blank spot on the painting, Metger comes in contact with the little doll itself, now animated, and has a fight with it. Metger is injured, but he manages to stop the doll by beating it with an American Flag. He also damages the painting with the flag, which starts to bleed. Metger takes the doll outside to his porch and ties it to a dart board. He then blasts the doll with his shotgun, and goes back inside to rant at the painting.

In the midst of his latest racist rant, Metger realizes more doll images in the painting have faded to white. Metger finds the previously blasted doll in the hallway, which attacks again and chases Metger into his office. Metger manages to lock the doll outside but sees that the painting has all the doll images faded to white. Terrified, Metger turns around to see an army of dolls, led by the same doll he blasted. He covers himself in the American flag as the dolls converge and devour him. Miss Cobbs then disappears from the painting and manifests herself in the room, holding the first doll in her arms, satisfied at the carnage taking place before them.

Meanwhile, the dealers have grown impatient and ready for the drugs, not wanting to listen to any more of Mr. Simms's strange stories. Ball notices a corpse in another room, and alerts the others to come and see it. When Simms asks them if they knew the man inside the casket, Bulldog says that he was just someone they had seen around their neighborhood. Mr. Simms proceeds to explain the final moments of the man known as Crazy K.

"Hard-Core Convert"
Jerome "Crazy K" Johns is a hardened gangster and homicidal psychopath who has killed many people mercilessly. He is driving down the streets of Los Angeles when he encounters his rival, Lil' Deke, whom he pursues and guns down. In retaliation, Lil' Deke's associates shoot at Crazy K. Before they can finish him off, the police arrive at the scene and gun down the attackers. Crazy K, badly injured but still alive, is arrested and sent to prison, serving a life sentence without parole.

Four years later, Dr. Cushing arrives at Crazy K's prison cell and transfers him to her facility for an experimental trial, mentioning that he'll be released from prison if he agrees to it and completes it. Crazy K meets an inmate who happens to be a homicidal white supremacist that raves about killing black people and the end of days for blacks. This angers Crazy K and causes him to punch him in the face. The man then asks Crazy K the race of the victims he killed, silencing Crazy K. The man grows fond of him and he tells him that there will be a few black people who will be spared as long as they think like him. Crazy K is told by Dr. Cushing that she purposely put him there to meet someone who is just like him. She then tells him that she has been hired by the government to administer a rehabilitation process on Crazy K, in hopes that he will change his ways. If he fails to redeem himself, he is told that he will rot in solitary confinement for the rest of his life.

Crazy K is put through a process of torture to make him learn the consequences of his actions. First, his hair (with a "K" cut into the front) is shaved off. He is then loaded onto a gyroscopic modulator, forced to visualize images involving KKK members and actual photographs of lynching victims, interspersed with grisly, stylized footage of gang violence and his own actions. Dr. Cushing expounds on the fact that Crazy K killed many innocent black people without remorse or second thought.

For the next part of the trial, Crazy K is put into a sensory deprivation chamber, where he is confronted by the souls of the people he has killed, intentionally or otherwise, including his friends and an innocent little girl. Despite hinting at his own personal abuse in his childhood, Crazy K refuses to accept any responsibility for his crimes, and Dr. Cushing tearfully warns him that he won't get another chance for forgiveness. Having refused the opportunity to redeem himself, Crazy K is transported back to the moment when he was shot. This time, he is finished off by the three gunmen, who leave his corpse abandoned in the street.

"Welcome to My Mortuary" (epilogue)
Following the telling of Crazy K's story, Stack, Ball, and Bulldog are revealed to be Crazy K's killers. In a heated turn of events, the dealers, having grown hostile with Simms and unnerved by the revelation that he knows their crime, threaten Simms, telling him he'll be killed unless he gives them their drugs. Simms leads them deeper into the funeral home and tells them their "reward" is in three closed caskets. Each drug dealer finds that the casket he opens contains their own corpse, revealing that they were dead all this time.

After disarming them, Simms explains that after the murder of Crazy K, they were killed by Crazy K's associates as retaliation (although in the story, they were shot and killed by the police, which is eventually proven false by Crazy K's Death and Mr Simms's Confirmation). Bulldog asks Simms how they can be dead when they are all seemingly alive, together in the same funeral home. Simms tells them that the funeral home is actually Hell and he transforms into Satan. The drug dealers scream in horror at this sight, as the walls of the funeral home shatter to reveal an inferno that consumes them. They are left to burn with all the tortured souls while Satan laughs.

Cast
Welcome to My Mortuary (framing segments)
 Clarence Williams III as Mr. Simms
 Joe Torry as "Stack"
 Samuel Monroe, Jr. as "Bulldog"
 De'Aundre Bonds as "Ball"

Rogue Cop Revelation
 Tom Wright as Martin Ezekiel Moorehouse
 Anthony Griffith as Officer Clarence Smith
 Wings Hauser as Officer Strom Richmond
 Michael Massee as Officer Newton Hauser
 Duane Whitaker as Officer Billy Crumfield

Boys Do Get Bruised
 Brandon Hammond as Walter Johnson
 Rusty Cundieff as Richard Garvey
 Paula Jai Parker as Sissy Johnson
 David Alan Grier as Carl

KKK Comeuppance
 Corbin Bernsen as Duke Metger
 Roger Guenveur Smith as Rhodie Willis
 Art Evans as Eli
 Christina Cundieff as Miss Cobbs

Hard-Core Convert
 Lamont Bentley as Jerome "Crazy K" Johns
 Rosalind Cash as Dr. Cushing
 Ricky Harris as "Lil' Deke"
 Rick Dean as Racist Inmate

Soundtrack

Production
According to Cundieff, the idea for "Tales from the Hood" came from a one-act play he performed a few times in L.A. called "The Black Horror Show: Blackanthropy." Shortly after the play wrapped, Cundieff said Darin Scott suggested they collaborate on a horror movie. "It has to be about something. It can't just be, 'We're scaring you,'" Cundieff said.

The "Tales from the Hood" story, "Boys Do Get Bruised," is loosely based on an incident from Cundieff's childhood. He remembered visiting a friend's house, who lived down the block from his childhood home in Pittsburgh, and seeing his friend's younger sister "gagged and hogtied" in the basement. Cundieff said he went home and told his dad, who was a detective in the juvenile division of the Pittsburgh police: "He said, 'I can't mess with those whites.' And he's probably right. He just felt that even with his badge and with his position he wasn't in a position to deal with that," Cundieff told Jordan Gass-Pooré, host of the podcast Pod of Madness. "I've always had an interest kind of in, I don't know if it was because of that moment, but child abuse, domestic violence is always kind of had some weird place in my head."

Cundieff's parents appear in the story, "KKK Comeuppance." His dad is the preacher who gives the eulogy to Rhodie and his mom is Miss Cobbs. Of his dad's performance: "He had written a sermon. I'm, like, 'You can't say all this.' ... And then, of course, when I called 'Action!' he, like, got all nervous." His mom had the opposite reaction: "My mom was an introvert, but she was great. She had no problem. ... She didn't have any lines, but I told her, like, 'You know, look mad, like, you know, when you were angry at me,' or something like that."

Release
The film was released theatrically on May 24, 1995. Later that year, the film was released on VHS and LaserDisc by HBO. In 1998, HBO Home Video released the film on DVD, which has since gone out of print. According to Cundieff, Universal Pictures currently holds the rights to the film, but there were no prints available to reissue the film on the Blu-ray format in 2015. In 2016, a remastered version of the film was released to Amazon.com, iTunes and Crackle. In November 2016, it was announced that the film was to be made available on Blu-ray from Scream Factory, which was released on April 18, 2017.

Reception

Critical reception for Tales from the Hood has been mixed.

Sequels
A sequel entitled Tales from the Hood 2 premiered at the Fantasia International Film Festival in July 2018, also written by Rusty Cundieff and Darin Scott, who shared directorial duties for the film. Keith David replaced Clarence Williams III as Mr. Simms due to Williams' retirement from acting. It was released on home video on October 2, 2018. Another sequel, Tales from the Hood 3, was released on October 6, 2020.

Tales from the Hood 3 stars Tony Todd and was filmed in Winnipeg. It features four stories, including the wraparound story. "The stories, you know, they're not as big as the first Tales," Cundieff told the podcast Pod of Madness. "But I do think that the stories are stronger, overall, than the second one, and the look of the film is better, a lot to do with the locations that we found."

See also 
 List of hood films

References

External links

1995 films
1995 horror films
1990s comedy horror films
1995 comedy-drama films
40 Acres and a Mule Filmworks films
American horror anthology films
American comedy horror films
American comedy-drama films
American gang films
American ghost films
American supernatural horror films
The Devil in film
Films about domestic violence
Films about police officers
Films about police misconduct
Films about racism
Films about haunted dolls
Films about the Ku Klux Klan
Films about witchcraft
Films directed by Rusty Cundieff
Films set in Los Angeles
Films scored by Christopher Young
Hell in popular culture
Hood films
American zombie films
American satirical films
African-American horror films
1990s satirical films
1990s English-language films
1990s American films